Murao is a Japanese surname. Notable people with the surname include:

, Japanese judoka
, Japanese-American bookseller
, Japanese footballer

Japanese-language surnames